A horse show is an event taking place over days or weeks, comprising competitions and displays in equestrian sports. These are lists of notable horse shows by country or geographical area.

Canada
Norfolk County Fair and Horse Show

France
Saut Hermès

Iceland
National Competition of Horsemen

Sweden
Falsterbo Horse Show
2012 Falsterbo Horse Show
Goteborg Horse Show

United Kingdom
Cardiff Horse Show
Clifden Show
Dublin Horse Show
2008 Dublin Horse Show
2008 Dublin Horse Show – Samsung Super League
2010 Dublin Horse Show
2011 Dublin Horse Show
Horse of the Year Show
Olympia London International Horse Show
Royal International Horse Show
2012 Royal International Horse Show
Royal Windsor Horse Show
South of England Show

United States 
All American Quarter Horse Congress
American Royal Horse Show
Devon Horse Show
Grand National and World Championship Morgan Horse Show
Hampton Classic Horse Show
Junior Hunter Finals
Lexington Junior League Horse Show
Missouri Fox Trotting Horse World Show and Celebration
Monmouth County Horse Show
National Horse Show
Racking Horse World Celebration
Scottsdale Arabian Horse Show
Sussex County Farm and Horse Show
Tennessee Walking Horse National Celebration
Upperville Colt & Horse Show
Wartrace Horse Show
World's Championship Horse Show
Winter Equestrian Festival

See also
List of horse races

.horse shows
Shows

de:Liste von Pferdesportveranstaltungen